Bilateral relations exist between Azerbaijan and the Tunisia in political, socio-economic, cultural and other spheres. Neither country has a resident ambassador.

Diplomatic relations 
Diplomatic relations between Azerbaijan and Tunisia were established on 1 July 1998.

According to the Order of the President of Azerbaijan Ilham Aliyev dated 30 November 2012, Tariq Aliyev was appointed as the Extraordinary Ambassador of Azerbaijan to Tunisia.

To present his credentials to the President of Tunisia, Muncef Marzouk, Ambassador Tarik Aliyev were in Tunis on 16–22 March 2014.

Economic cooperation 
On 15 November 2005, an Azerbaijani delegation headed by Minister of Communications and Information Technology Ali Abbasov visited Tunisia to participate in the second stage of the world summit on the information society. During this summit, the "Azerbaijan Day" was organized on 17 November.

According to statistics from the United Nations Trade Office (COMTRADE), in 2011, the volume of exports of machinery, pile-drivers and pile-extractors from Tunisia to Azerbaijan amounted to 4.61 million US dollars.

According to the State Statistics Committee of Azerbaijan, in 2013 the volume of trade between Azerbaijan and Tunisia amounted to 187.1 million US dollars (imports – 0.3 million US dollars, exports – 186.8 million US dollars, foreign trade balance – 186.5 million US dollars).

According to statistics from The United Nations Trade Office (COMTRADE), in 2015, the volume of exports of measuring instruments and machines from Tunisia to Azerbaijan amounted to 522 US dollars.

In 2020, the volume of exports from Azerbaijan to Tunisia amounted to 142.6 million US dollars.

Cultural ties 
In June 2012, an event was held in Tunis on the occasion of the Republic of Azerbaijan Day.

In accordance with the action plan of the state program "Azerbaijani youth in 2011–2015", a contest of essays on the theme "What do I know about Azerbaijan?" was organized in March–May 2014 in Tunis. On 23 August – 1 September 2014, the Ministry of youth and sports of Azerbaijan organized a study visit to Azerbaijan for the winners of this competition.

International cooperation 
In the international arena, cooperation is carried out within the framework of various international organizations, such as the UN, the OIC, etc.

See also  
Foreign relations of Azerbaijan
Foreign relations of Tunisia

References 
 

 
Tunisia
Azerbaijan